Angkasa 2 High School or better known as SKY 2, is a high school in a private complex in Halim Perdana Kusuma Jakarta.

History 
SMA Angkasa 2 is one of two dozen more schools under the management of the Foundation Ardhya Garini (Yasarini) BPC Halim Air Base - East Jakarta. Initial appearance in 1994, is a Class Away of high school located in Complex Angkasa TRIKORA Halim. First opened as the number of classes 4 classes, the next trip is growing rapidly .. 
Ex-primary school occupies the building on Jl Angkasa VIII. Avia - Halim Squadron Complex, in accordance with the demands of existing and development, was expanded and extensive location plus the number of classes. 
Because of rapid development, then in 1999, this school "split" into SMA Angkasa 2 Jakarta, while its parent in complex TRIKORA, changed its name to SMA Angkasa 1. 
Sequence leadership that began in 1968 and is now as follows:

 Drs. H. Sugianto, MM : 1994-1999
 Drs. Bambang Subyantoro, MM : 1999-2000
 Dra. Hj. Sri Handayani : 2000-2009
 Triyadi Setyanto, SPd. : 2009-2012
 Dra. Hj. Sri Utami : 2012–present

Extracurricular 
SMA Angkasa 2 Jakarta has a lot of activity extracurricular, including: 
 Marawis 
 Islamic Spirituality / Christianity 
 Tae Kwon Do 
 Simplified / Traditional Dance 
 Futsal son / daughter 
 Basket son / daughter 
 Saman 
 Scientific Teens 
 Badminton 
 English Club 
 Japanese Club 
 Volleyball 
 Paskibra 
 Chorus

External links 
 official site

Senior high schools in Indonesia
Schools in Jakarta